The Aisin AW F8FXX series is the world's first 8-speed automatic transmission designed for use in transverse engine applications. Aisin designed the transmission to package in the same space as preceding 6-speed designs, while increasing the total gear spread and reducing gear spacing. It is also called the EAT8 (PSA), GA8F22AW (BMW & Mini), TG-81SC (Volvo),  AF50-8 (Opel/Vauxhall),  AWF8F45 (Cadillac), and AQ450 (Volkswagen Group). First usage was in the 2013 model year Lexus RX350 F Sport.

Gear ratios

Max torque rating 
 AWF8F35: 
 AWF8F45:

Applications

BMW/MINI:
2015–present BMW 2 Series Active Tourer (F45) and Gran Tourer (F46) with 4-cylinder engines
 2016–present BMW X1 (F48) with 4-cylinder engines
 2016–present Mini Clubman (F54) with 4-cylinder engines
 2016–present Mini Countryman (F60) with 4-cylinder engines (and B38 with AWD)
2018–present Mini Cooper SD (F55/F56) and JCW (F56) due to torque output over 300Nm
 2018–present BMW X2 (F39) with 4-cylinder engines
 2019–present BMW 1 Series (F40) with 4-cylinder engines
 2020–present BMW 2 Series Gran Coupé with 4-cylinder engines

Changan:
 2020–present Changan UNI-K

Citroën:
 2017–present Citroën C5 Aircross
 2018–present Citroën Grand C4 SpaceTourer
 2019–present Citroën Berlingo
 2020–present Citroën C4
 2021–present Citroën C5 X

DS Automobiles:
 2018–present DS 7
 2019–present DS 3
 2020–present DS 9
 2021–present DS 4

Geely:
 2019–present Geely Xingyue

GM:
 2016 Chevrolet Malibu
2017 Buick LaCrosse
 2017–2019 Cadillac XT5
 2018–2020 Buick Regal TourX, (I4 AWD only)

Jaguar:
 2020–present Jaguar E-Pace (1.5t 3-cylinder engines)

Land Rover:
 2020–present Discovery Sport (1.5t 3-cylinder engines)
 2020–present Evoque (1.5t 3-cylinder engines)

Lexus:
 2016–present Lexus RX (V6)
 2018–present Lexus ES (non-hybrid engines)
 2020–present Lexus LM (LM350)
 2022– Lexus NX (non-hybrid engines)

Lynk & Co:
 2017–present 01
 2018–present 03
 2020–present 05
 2021–present 02
 2021–present 09

Mitsubishi:
 2017–present Mitsubishi Eclipse Cross (diesel engines)
 2019–present Mitsubishi Delica (diesel engines)

Opel/Vauxhall:
 2017–present Opel Insignia
 2017–present Opel Grandland X
 2018–present Opel Combo
 2020–present Opel Corsa
 2020–present Opel Mokka
 2021–present Opel Astra L

Peugeot:
 2017–present Peugeot 5008
 2017–present Peugeot 308
 2019–present Peugeot 3008 1.6 EAT8 & 2.0 EAT8
 2018–present Peugeot 508 EAT8
 2019–present Peugeot Rifter EAT8
 2019–present Peugeot 208
 2019–present Peugeot 2008

Polestar:
2019–present Polestar 1

Škoda:
 2018–present Škoda Karoq (Australian market)
 2020–present Škoda Octavia (some markets)

Toyota (as UA8xx):
 2018–present Toyota Avalon (non-hybrid engines)
 2018–present Toyota Alphard (V6)
 2018–present Toyota Camry (non-hybrid engines)
 2018–2020 Toyota Sienna
 2019–present Toyota RAV4 (non-hybrid)
 2020–present Toyota Highlander (V6)

Volkswagen/MAN:
 2017-present Volkswagen Crafter and MAN TGE (transversely mounted engine only)
2018–present Volkswagen Tiguan (US version only)
2018–present Volkswagen Atlas (US version only)
2018–present Volkswagen Golf (US MK7 & Australian MK8)
2019–present Volkswagen Jetta (US version only)
2019–present Volkswagen Arteon (US version only)
2022–Volkswagen Taos (FWD models)

Volvo (TG-81SC/SD):
 2014–2016 Volvo S80 II
 2014–2016 Volvo V70 II
 2014–2016 Volvo XC70 II
 2014–2017 Volvo XC60
 2015–2018 Volvo S60 II
 2015–2018 Volvo V60
 2014–present Volvo XC90 II
 2016–present Volvo S90 II
 2016–present Volvo V90 II
 2016–present Volvo V40
 2017–present Volvo XC60 II
 2017–present Volvo XC40
 2018–present Volvo V60 II
 2018–present Volvo S60 III

References

Aisin transmissions